Communauté d'agglomération Val d'Yerres Val de Seine is the communauté d'agglomération, an intercommunal structure, covering southern suburbs of Paris. It is located in the Essonne department, in the Île-de-France region, northern France. It was created in January 2016. Its population was 177,769 in 2014. Its seat is in Brunoy. Its area is 66.4 km2. Its population was 177,020 in 2018. It takes its name from the valleys of the rivers Yerres and Seine.

Composition
The communauté d'agglomération consists of the following 9 communes:

Boussy-Saint-Antoine
Brunoy
Crosne
Draveil
Épinay-sous-Sénart
Montgeron
Quincy-sous-Sénart
Vigneux-sur-Seine
Yerres

References

Val d'Yerres Val de Seine
Val d'Yerres Val de Seine